Phiri Uya (Quechua phiri destroyed, uya face, "destroyed face", Hispanicized names Piriuya, Piríuyac) is a  mountain in the Andes of Peru. It is located in the Lima Region, Huaura Province, Ambar District. Phiri Uya lies at the Phiru Uya valley, southwest of Waqra Punta.

References

Mountains of Peru
Mountains of Lima Region